Yves Ciampi (9 February 1921 – 5 November 1982) was a French film director. He was married to Japanese actress Kishi Keiko from 1957 to 1975. His 1965 film Heaven on One's Head was entered into the 4th Moscow International Film Festival where it won a Golden Prize. In 1969 he was a member of the jury at the 6th Moscow International Film Festival.

Filmography

1950: Suzanne and the Robbers 
1950: Un certain monsieur
1951: Un grand patron
1952: Le Plus heureux des hommes
1953: The Slave
1954: Le Guérisseur
1955: Les héros sont fatigués
1957: Typhoon Over Nagasaki
1959: 
1961: Who Are You, Mr. Sorge?
1961: Liberté I
1965: Le Ciel sur la tête
1969: A quelques jours près

References

External links

1921 births
1982 deaths
Film directors from Paris